Czech draughts is a board game played in the territory formerly occupied by Czechoslovakia (the present day Czech Republic and Slovakia).  It is governed by the Czech Draughts Federation.

Game rules 
The draughtsboard has eight ranks and eight files.  Players each have twelve draughtsmen on opposite sides of the board, arranged on black squares only, in three rows. Men move one square diagonally forward. Once a man has reached the furthest rank of the board from the owning player, it becomes a king. Kings move diagonally forward or backward any number of positions.

A player who cannot move, either because he has lost all of his pieces, or because no legal move remains, has lost. The game is a draw when it is theoretically impossible (i.e. with perfect play) to capture any of the opponent's pieces.

Capture rules 
 Captures are mandatory in Czech draughts: when a man is found adjacent to an opposing piece behind which is an empty position, the player must attain this empty position and remove the opposing man from the board. 
 Should a player be able to capture either with a man or a king, he must do so with the king.
 If multiple captures are possible, the player may choose between capturing one piece or the entire line; the capture of a partial line is not permitted. If multiple captures are performed, the pieces are removed from the board en masse when the capture is concluded.
 Players cannot capture their own pieces.

Variant
A misere game, as with other competitions, is known, where the object is to lose all one's pieces.

Regional differences 

Although Czech draughts is itself a regional variant of the draughts game, the version played in the Slovak Republic is slightly different in that each player begins with only two ranks of men, and that the huffing rule is enforced: if a piece that must capture does not do so, the opponent may, at his option, take it before his own move.  Furthermore, if a player has no legal moves, but does have men on the board, the game is a draw. This variant is played only in Slovakia (Slovak Republic) and probably by the children.

See also 
 International draughts
 English draughts
 Pool checkers
 Russian checkers
 Italian draughts
 Turkish draughts
 Draughts

External links
 

Draughts variants
Czech inventions